Karina Lorentzen Dehnhardt (born 26 October 1973 in Kolding) is a Danish politician, who is a member of the Folketing for the Socialist People's Party. She was elected into parliament at the 2019 Danish general election. She was previously a member of parliament between 2007 and 2015.

Political career
Lorentzen first ran for parliament in the 2007 Danish general election, where she was elected into parliament with 1,251 votes. She was reelected in 2011 with 4,877 votes. She failed to get elected in 2015, but as elected in again at the 2019 election, receiving 4,698	votes.

External links 
 Biography on the website of the Danish Parliament (Folketinget)

References 

Living people
1973 births
People from Kolding Municipality
21st-century Danish women politicians
Women members of the Folketing
Socialist People's Party (Denmark) politicians
Members of the Folketing 2007–2011
Members of the Folketing 2011–2015
Members of the Folketing 2019–2022
Members of the Folketing 2022–2026